Nightmusic Volume 1  is a debut compilation album by English electronic dance music producer and DJ Steve Helstrip, featuring various trance and electronica artists.

Track listing 
 Disc 1: The DJ
 The Thrillseekers - By Your Side
 Above & Beyond Vs. Andy Moor - Air For Life
 FB - Who's Knocking (Ferry Corsten Remix)
 AR52 - Piiska
 Kay Stone - Alone
 Skyform - Infinite
 Haylon - Starfighter
 Summer Sessions - Blossom (Haylon Remix)
 Acues & Elitist - Zonderland (8 Wonders Remix)
 Jose Amnesia Vs. Serp - Second Day (Martin Roth Remix)
 Sander Van Doorn - A.K.A.
 Orkan - Shibuya (Got Drums? Remix)
 Mr. Sam - Lyteo (Rank 1 Remix)
 Mike Koglin - 1:1.618
 A Force - Behind Silence

 Disc 2: The Producer
 Pulser - Square One (The Thrillseekers Remix)
 8th Wonder - The Morning After
 Alibi - Eternity
 Lange - Sincere For You
 Free Radical - Surreal
 Witness Of Wonder - Emotions In Motion
 Usual Aspect - Mr. Blue
 Evolve - Safe To Dream
 Hydra - Affinity
 Matt Schwartz - Can You Feel (What I'm Going Thru)
 Ferry Corsten - Sublime
 Jan Johnston - Calling Your Name

2006 compilation albums